Heart Lake Secondary School, commonly known as HLSS or Heart Lake, is a public secondary school in Brampton, Ontario, Canada. It is located at the corner of Conestoga Drive and Wexford Road. The school was founded in 1988 and is a part of the Peel District School Board. The school has 1150 students enrolled as of September 2019.

Heart Lake has two SHSM programs in Arts & Culture and Information & Communication technology, as well as both extra curricular band, drama and athletics programs.

The school has a strong relationship with its many feeder schools, including Robert H. Lagerquist Senior Public School, Alloa Public School and Cheyne Public School, working together for annual events and other activities throughout the year.

History 
Heart Lake Secondary School was founded in 1988. The school is named after the nearby Heart Lake Conservation Area.

Timeline of School History 

2005 - Changed from yearbooks to "yeardiscs"
2006 - Heart Lake wins the Canadian Environmental Award Green Team Challenge
2006 - Graduating students create first "Underground Yearbooks"
September 2008 - New principal replaces the old for the first time since 1999
2008 - HLSS becomes the first certified Ecoschool in Peel, achieving silver status for its environmental efforts
2008 - Dawar Siddiqui is elected as the president of the newly formed DECA-based Business Club created within the school.
2009 - School's first ever eco fashion show was held
2009 - Yearbooks return to Heart Lake
2010 - 1st Semi-Formal.

Annual events

Carnival 
Most years towards the end of the school year the Student Activity Council holds the school's annual Carnival. The event generally contains large inflatables, games, popcorn, cotton candy, music, and other fun activities. During the 2018/2019 school year the Student Activity Council was able to offer the Carnival free of charge to the entire student body.

Semi-Formal 
Since 2010 Heart Lake's Student Activity Council has held its annual Semi-Formal with varying themes each year. The only exception was the 2018/2019 school year when sales were too low and the Semi-Formal had to be canceled.

Talent Show 
Annual Heart Lake Talent Show occurs every April, and tryouts happen two months before in February. Students may pay $2 to attend, which also allows them to miss their period 4 class on that day. Unlike buyouts, even those students who have paid cannot leave the school property and must attend the talent show. Students who have teachers who are helping out with the talent show as their period 4 teachers may attend the show for free, if the seats are still available. In 2008, there were 6 performances: martial arts, juggling, rapping, two singing performances, and modern Indian dance. Students have amateurly videotaped the performances with the school's permission and uploaded onto YouTube for 2007 and 2008 talent shows (refer to section below for the playlist link).

School Drama Production 
Heart Lake's Drama production occurs annually in May, based on various classical novels and plays. 2009's You're a Good Man, Charlie Brown was Heart Lake's first ever musical production. As of 2019, two school productions are typically put on, a Drama Showcase

School Programs

Link Crew program 

In the 2008–2009 school year, Heart Lake began the Link Crew program that is offered to all high schools and secondary schools in North America. Link Crew allows the school to choose one hundred Grade 11s and 12s to be linked with freshmen throughout the year. The "Link Leaders" help the freshman get involved by informing them about the activities put on by the school and local communities. These students also help to bridge the gap between freshmen and the rest of the school, when the younger students may feel like they don't belong. The leaders are a positive role model for the freshman students during the important transition from middle school to high school.

Regional Enhanced learning program 

Heart Lake's Regional Enhanced Learning Program is designed for exceptional intellectual-gifted students who require extensive modification of the regular school program. To enter the program, you must have already been designated  exceptional intellectual-gifted/  The program strives to maximize each student's potential, develops their capacity for self-directed learning, and encourages interaction among gifted peers. Only specific coursers are offered at this level, which includes Grade 9-12 English, Grade 9-12 Math, Grade 9 -12 Sciences, Grade 10 History, Grade 9 Geography, Grade 9-12 French and a few others. For these courses the gifted students are placed into a single class, going at around the same pace as the regular academic students, with some modifications. Several schools offered this program but in 2005, it was made available only to Heart Lake Secondary School in the northern Peel District School Board area.

Notable alumni
Michael Bailey, CFL lineman and tackle
Michael Cera, actor
Khamica Bingham

Murder of Eric Levack 
In 2003, grade nine student Eric Levack, 14, was murdered in the wooded area behind the school during lunch break. The perpetrator was classmate Justin Morton, also 14. Morton pleaded guilty to first degree murder and in 2004 was sentenced as an adult to life in prison, with no eligibility of parole for seven years. Morton was the first person in Canada charged with first degree murder under the newly enacted Youth Criminal Justice Act, which came into force on April 1, 2003, the day of the murder. Morton anonymously appeared in the 2007 documentary film In the Shadow of Feeling, which focused on psychopathic personalities, and spoke about the murder. A lilac tree, planted in memory of Levack, stands on the lawn in front of Heart Lake Secondary School.

See also
List of high schools in Ontario

References

External links

 Heart Lake Secondary School website
 Teacher My Class Sites - Heart Lake
 Heart Lake Talent Show 2008 playlist on YouTube

Peel District School Board
High schools in Brampton
Educational institutions established in 1988
1988 establishments in Ontario